The 48th ceremony of the People's Choice Awards was held on December 6, 2022, at the Barker Hangar in Santa Monica, California. Hosted for a second consecutive year by Kenan Thompson, the show was broadcast live simultaneously on NBC and E!. Nominees spanning 40 categories for film, television, music, and popular culture were announced on October 26. Nope and This Is Us led the Film and Television categories respectively with six nominations each while Bad Bunny led the Music categories with seven.

Doctor Strange in the Multiverse of Madness was the most-awarded Film nominee, winning three awards overall, including The Movie of 2022. Stranger Things topped the Television nominees, also earning three wins, including The Show of 2022. Taylor Swift was the most-awarded nominee in the Music categories, winning the awards for Female Artist, Album, and Music Video of 2022—she won in the last two categories with Midnights (2022) and "Anti-Hero" respectively. Ryan Reynolds was honored with the People's Icon Award, Lizzo received the People's Champion Award and also won The Song of 2022 with "About Damn Time", while Shania Twain was presented with the Music Icon Award.

Performers 
Shania Twain and Lauren Spencer-Smith were announced as the show's only performers on December 5, 2022. Twain performed a medley of her most popular songs, including her newest single "Waking Up Dreaming" from her forthcoming sixth studio album Queen of Me (2023), against "an ever-changing backdrop of leopard prints, desert light show and fire". During "That Don't Impress Me Much", the singer changed the "famous spoken-word 'Brad Pitt' line" to instead name-drop Ryan Reynolds who was in attendance as the Icon Award recipient. Multiple media outlets reported Twain's appearance as the highlight of the show, with Rolling Stone writing that the singer "delivered a powerhouse performance" and "owned the stage", while Billboard said that "Twain proved just what makes her a Music Icon". Vulture.com described the performance as "characteristically over-the-top...full of sparkles (all the way up to her top hat), fire, cowgirl dancers, hot men playing instruments", with writer Justin Cuarto further commenting that Twain defended her title as Music Icon and was "still queen of the stage".

Presenters 
Kenan Thompson was announced as the show's host for a second consecutive year, on October 26, 2022. The complete lineup of presenters was revealed on December 5.
 Amy Poehler – presented The Country Artist of 2022
 Sarah Hyland – presented The Drama Movie of 2022
 David Spade – presented The Comedy Movie Star of 2022
 Sarah Michelle Gellar – presented The Competition Contestant of 2022 to Selma Blair
 Billy Porter – introduced and presented the Music Icon Award to Twain
 Dwyane Wade – presented The Male TV Star of 2022
 Nikki Glaser – presented The Nighttime Talk Show of 2022
 Heidi Klum and Michaela Jaé Rodriguez – presented The Reality Show of 2022
 Lil Rel Howery – introduced and presented the People's Icon Award to Ryan Reynolds
 Cast of The Real Housewives of Beverly Hills – presented The Drama TV Star of 2022
 Ana Gasteyer and Niecy Nash – presented The Daytime Talk Show of 2022
 Colin Hanks and Mckenna Grace – presented The Female TV Star of 2022
 Shari Johnson-Jefferson – introduced and presented the People's Champion Award to Lizzo
 The Miz and Maryse Mizanin – introduced Lauren Spencer-Smith
 Chandra Wilson and Sarah Hyland – introduced ..."See Her Now"
 James Corden – presented The Song of 2022
 George Lopez and Mayan Lopez – presented The Drama Show of 2022

Winners and nominees 
Nominees were revealed online on October 26, 2022. Voting opened that same day on the PCAs website and Twitter and closed on November 9. In the Film categories, Nope led the nominations with six overall. Following with five apiece are Bullet Train, Top Gun: Maverick and The Adam Project. This Is Us is the most-nominated series in the Television categories, with six, followed by Abbott Elementary, Grey's Anatomy, Law & Order: Special Victims Unit, Saturday Night Live, and Stranger Things, with four each. Bad Bunny led the Music categories with seven nominations, followed by Harry Styles who earned five—Styles garnered six nominations overall, including for The Drama Movie Star of 2022 for his role in Don't Worry Darling.

Winners are listed first and highlighted in bold.

Film

TV

Music

Pop culture 

Source:

Other awards 
 People's Icon Award – Ryan Reynolds
 People's Champion Award – Lizzo
 Music Icon Award – Shania Twain

References 

 

 

December 2022 events in the United States
2022 awards in the United States
2022 film awards
2022 music awards
2022 television awards
2022 in Los Angeles County, California
People's Choice Awards